RT Andromedae is a variable star in the constellation of Andromeda. The system is estimated to be 322 light-years (98.7 parsecs) away.

RT Andromedae is classified as a RS Canum Venaticorum variable, a type of close eclipsing binary star. It varies from an apparent visual magnitude of 9.83 at minimum brightness to a magnitude of 8.97 at maximum brightness, with a period of 0.6289216 days. The system consists of a G-type main-sequence star slightly more massive than the Sun, and a K-type main-sequence star slightly less massive; the light curve of this eclipsing binary exhibits secular variations of period and minima.

Presence of a third body

According to Pribulla et al. (2000), the changes in variability could be ascribed to a third object in the system, with even a possible fourth. Its minimum mass is estimated to be 5 percent the mass of the Sun (roughly 50 times the mass of Jupiter), with an orbital period close to 75 years and an eccentricity that is thought to be fairly high (at 0.56). Such an object could likely turn out to be a brown dwarf or even a massive jovian planet. However, a recent paper of Manzoori (2009) noticed that there is a decreasing trend in the orbital period, so magnetic braking could explain better the evolution of this orbital system.

References

Andromeda (constellation)
Andromedae, RT
RS Canum Venaticorum variables
Hypothetical planetary systems
G-type main-sequence stars
K-type main-sequence stars
114484